Ángel País (born February 26, 1987, in Montevideo, Uruguay) is a Uruguayan footballer currently playing for Colegio Nacional Iquitos of the Primera Division in Peru.

Teams
  Montevideo Wanderers 2008
  Sport Club Campo Mourão 2009
  Peñarol 2009-2010
  Colegio Nacional Iquitos 2011–present

External links
 

1987 births
Living people
Uruguayan footballers
Uruguayan expatriate footballers
Montevideo Wanderers F.C. players
Peñarol players
Colegio Nacional Iquitos footballers
Expatriate footballers in Peru
Expatriate footballers in Brazil
Association football forwards